Brasseya Johnson Allen (1762 – ) was a poet who is thought to be the first woman to publish a book of poetry in Maryland.

Allen was a daughter of William Johnson, a landholder in the county of Wicklow, Leinster, Ireland, was born at Temple Lyon, her father's mansion, situated in that county. In 1782 the family moved, it seems, to Arklow, a seaport-town in the same county. She married the Rev. John Allen, a Methodist minister. Her husband had been ordained in Ireland and, in 1795, he took charge of St. George's church, Harford County, Maryland, in connection with a school. He became, in 1875, a professor in St. John's College, Annapolis, and, in 1821, he held a professorship in the University of Maryland in Baltimore. He died in 1830, at the age of seventy. Mrs. Brasseya Allen's literary work consists of a volume of poems entitled Pastorals, Elegies, Odes, Epistles, and Other Poems, by Mrs. Allen, printed by Daniel P. Ruff, Abingdon, Md., 1806.

References

External links
 

Created via preloaddraft
1762 births
1831 deaths
Poets from Maryland